Nicolas Dauphas is a French-American planetary scientist and isotope geochemist. He is the Louis Block professor of geochemistry and cosmochemistry in the Department of the Geophysical Sciences and Enrico Fermi Institute at the University of Chicago. His research focuses on isotope geochemistry and cosmochemistry. He studies the origin and evolution of planets and other objects in the solar system by analyzing the natural distributions of elements and their isotopes using mass spectrometers.

Career 
Born on December 10, 1975, in Nantes, Brittany, France, Dauphas received a B.Sc. degree from École Nationale Supérieure de Géologie in Nancy, France in 1998. He obtained a Ph.D. in geochemistry and cosmochemistry from Institut National Polytechnique de Lorraine in 2002, working with Bernard Marty and Laurie Reisberg. He then completed his postdoctoral research at the Enrico Fermi Institute of the University of Chicago and the Field Museum of Natural History from 2002 to 2004, before joining the faculty at the University of Chicago in 2004.

In 2005, Dauphas was awarded Nier Prize  of the Meteoritical Society which recognizes outstanding research in meteoritics and closely allied fields by young scientists. In 2007, he was awarded the David and Lucile Packard Foundation Fellowship, given to nationwide, most promising early-career scientists and engineers. He won the 2008 Houtermans Award, given by the European Association of Geochemistry for outstanding contributions to geochemistry. He was awarded the James B. Macelwane Medal of the American Geophysical Union (AGU) for “significant contributions to the geophysical sciences”, and was selected as an AGU Fellow in 2011. In 2014, he became a Fellow of the Meteoritical Society. He was one of the finalists of 2017 Blavatnik National Awards. In 2019, he was selected as a Geochemical Fellow of the Geochemical Society and European Association of Geochemistry.

Dauphas was part of the preliminary examination team for JAXA's Hayabusa2 mission, which returned a fragment of Ryugu carbonaceous asteroid to Earth for scientific research. He was selected as a member of the Mars Sample Return Campaign Science Group in 2022.

Research activities 
By analyzing the isotopic compositions of stable and radiogenic nuclides in meteorites, Dauphas investigates the timing and processes that lead to the formation of Solar System bodies and the establishment of habitable conditions on Earth and Mars. He used iron isotopes to study how the iron biogeochemical cycle of the Earth changed through time. He established that Mars was formed rapidly, within the first 2~4 million years of the birth of the Solar System, which explains the much smaller size of Mars compared to Earth and Venus. He first identified the mineralogical carrier of the 54Cr isotopic anomalies in meteorites as Cr-rich nano-sized spinels from supernovae. He constrained the nature of Earth’s accreting materials through time, using a novel approach that relies on the different affinities of elements with Earth's core, and showed that the materials formed Earth are from an isotopically homogeneous reservoir.

References

External links 
 Nicolas Dauphas publications indexed by Google Scholar
 Nicolas Dauphas - AGU Fall Meeting 2018 - The Daly Lecture

1975 births
Living people